The Shehecheyanu blessing ("Who has given us life") is a common Jewish prayer said to celebrate special occasions. It is said to express gratitude to God for new and unusual experiences or possessions. The blessing is recorded in the Talmud, indicating that it has been recited for over 1500 years.

Recitation

The blessing of Shehecheyanu is recited in thanks or commemoration of:

Generally, when doing or experiencing something that occurs infrequently from which one derives pleasure or benefit.
The beginning of a holiday, including Passover, Shavuot, Rosh Hashanah, Yom Kippur, Sukkot, Simhat Torah and Hanukkah, but not holidays commemorating sad events, such as Tisha B'av.
The first performance of certain mitzvot in a year, including sitting in a sukkah, eating matzah at the Passover Seder, reading the megillah, or lighting the candles on Hanukkah.
Eating a new fruit for the first time since Rosh Hashanah.
Normally said before the blessing over the fruit, but some customarily say it afterwards.
The fruit must be fresh, not dried.
Seeing a friend who has not been seen in thirty days.
Acquiring a new home or other significant possessions.
The birth of a child (but not at the circumcision).
A pidyon haben ceremony.
During a ritual immersion in a mikveh as part of a conversion.
On arrival in Israel.

Some have the custom of saying it at the ceremony of the Birkat Hachama, which is recited once every 28 years in the month of Nisan/Adar II.

When several reasons apply (such as the beginning of Passover, together with the mitzvot of matzah, marror, etc.), the blessing is only said once.

It is not recited at a circumcision, since that involves pain, nor at the Counting of the Omer, since that is a task that does not give pleasure and causes sadness at the thought that the actual Omer ceremony cannot be performed because of the destruction of the Temple.

Text

Some traditions dictate saying "lizman" rather than "lazman" ("to [this] season"); this follows the ruling of the Mishnah Berurah and Aruch Hashulchan, following Magen Avraham, and is followed by Chabad, but this seems to be a minority usage and is contrary to usual Hebrew usage.

Modern history
The Israeli Declaration of Independence was publicly read in Tel Aviv on May 14, 1948, before the expiration of the British Mandate at midnight. After the first Prime Minister of Israel, David Ben-Gurion, read the Declaration of Independence, Rabbi Yehuda Leib Maimon recited the Shehecheyanu blessing, and the Declaration of Independence was signed. The ceremony concluded with the singing of "Hatikvah."

Avshalom Haviv finished his speech in court on June 10, 1947, with the Shehecheyanu blessing.

There is a common musical rendition of the blessing composed by Meyer Machtenberg, an Eastern European choirmaster who composed it in the United States in the 19th century.

Media
 MP3 file - Shehecheyanu blessing from VirtualCantor.com (tune for the first night of Chanukah)
 Sheet music for Shehecheyanu

See also
List of Jewish prayers and blessings
Halachipedia article on Shehecheyanu

References

Jewish blessings